The Wizardwar is a fantasy novel by Elaine Cunningham, set in the world of the Forgotten Realms, and based on the Dungeons & Dragons role-playing game. It is the third and final novel in the "Counselors & Kings" series. It was published in paperback in March 2002.

Plot summary
The foreign armies were defeated. Waiting for help in the field of Black Fairies, Tizgone experiences the power that makes her an anomaly in Halruaa. Matteo, with the help of a mysterious secret that as king he must struggle with the affairs of a kingdom which stirred after decades of placidity, why Andris has strangely taken prisoner and who is behind powerful spells dropped during battles, among other things. While the company is in full Halruaa disorder, Kiva forgetting who it was, returned to finish his plan with which to shake the kingdom to its foundations. Everything heads for the outbreak of a civil war, a war of wizards for the heart of Halruaa.

Reception

References

2002 American novels
Forgotten Realms novels
Novels by Elaine Cunningham